Sphecodosoma is a genus of sweat bees in the family Halictidae. There are at least three described species in Sphecodosoma.

Species
These three species belong to the genus Sphecodosoma:
 Sphecodosoma beameri (Bohart, 1965)
 Sphecodosoma dicksoni (Timberlake, 1961)
 Sphecodosoma pratti Crawford, 1907

References

Further reading

 

Halictidae
Articles created by Qbugbot